Rerep (also Pangkumu or Tisman) is one of the great many languages of the Malekula Coast group spoken in Vanuatu.  In 1983 it had 375 speakers out of an ethnic population of 580.  Portions of the Bible were translated into Rerep between 1892 and 1913.

External links 
 Materials on Rerep are included in the open access Arthur Capell collections (AC1 and AC2) held by Paradisec
 Aviva MPI Shimelman collection of Rerep materials in Paradisec

References

Malekula languages
Languages of Vanuatu